Osgood is a town in Center Township, Ripley County, in the U.S. state of Indiana. The population was 1,624 at the 2010 census.

History
Osgood was platted in 1854 when the railroad was extended to that point. The town was named for A. L. Osgood, a railroad official. A post office called Osgood has been in operation since 1855. In the 1890s, Osgood was a sundown town, where African Americans were not allowed to reside. By then, Osgood was still much more closely connected to Cincinnati than Indianapolis in terms of trade.

In 1999, the community received a $23 million bequest from the Gilmore and Golda Reynolds Foundation, which was established by two lifelong Osgood residents to assist the town government as well as local non-profit organizations.

Geography
Osgood is located at  (39.129062, -85.291893).

Demographics

2010 census
As of the census of 2010, there were 1,624 people, 638 households, and 417 families living in the town. The racial makeup of the town was 98.2% White, 0.1% African American, 0.2% Native American, 0.1% from other races, and 1.5% from two or more races. Hispanic or Latino of any race were 1.3% of the population.

There were 638 households, of which 36.2% had children under the age of 18 living with them, 44.7% were married couples living together, 15.2% had a female householder with no husband present, 5.5% had a male householder with no wife present, and 34.6% were non-families. 31.2% of all households were made up of individuals, and 14% had someone living alone who was 65 years of age or older. The average household size was 2.45 and the average family size was 3.06.

The median age in the town was 36 years. 26.9% of residents were under the age of 18; 8.5% were between the ages of 18 and 24; 26% were from 25 to 44; 22.3% were from 45 to 64; and 16.4% were 65 years of age or older. The gender makeup of the town was 47.5% male and 52.5% female.

2000 census
As of the census of 2000, there were 1,669 people, 668 households, and 424 families living in the town. The racial makeup of the town was 98.98% White, 0.12% African American, 0.54% Native American, 0.12% Asian, 0.06% from other races, and 0.18% from two or more races. Hispanic or Latino of any race were 0.96% of the population.

There were 668 households, out of which 34.0% had children under the age of 18 living with them, 47.2% were married couples living together, 12.3% had a female householder with no husband present, and 36.4% were non-families. 31.3% of all households were made up of individuals, and 16.5% had someone living alone who was 65 years of age or older. The average household size was 2.41 and the average family size was 3.03.

In the town, the population was spread out, with 27.4% under the age of 18, 8.0% from 18 to 24, 26.4% from 25 to 44, 19.7% from 45 to 64, and 18.6% who were 65 years of age or older. The median age was 36 years. For every 100 females, there were 89.7 males. For every 100 females age 18 and over, there were 83.4 males.

The median income for a household in the town was $29,659, and the median income for a family was $35,750. Males had a median income of $29,375 versus $20,938 for females. The per capita income for the town was $13,842. About 9.2% of families and 11.0% of the population were below the poverty line, including 10.4% of those under age 18 and 17.2% of those age 65 or over.

Education
The town has a lending library, the Osgood Public Library.

Notable people
Grover Hartley, baseball player and umpire
 Mary Aikins Currie, Indiana State Auditor from 1970 to 1978.

References

External links
 Town of Osgood, Indiana website

Towns in Ripley County, Indiana
Towns in Indiana
Sundown towns in Indiana